The 2022–23 season is the 5th season of F.C. Nassaji in the Iranian Football Pro League. In addition to the domestic league, Nassaji also competes in this season's Hazfi Cup and Super Cup.

Kits

Season overview 
June

On June 20, Hamid Motahari, the former assistant coach of Persepolis club, officially became the head coach of the Nassaji.

Coaching and Management staff

Technical Staff

Management chart

Players

First team

Transfer

In

Summer In

Out

Summer Out

Pre-season and friendlies

Competitions

Overall record

Persian Gulf Pro League

League table

Results summary

Results by round

Matches

Hazfi Cup

Iranian Super Cup

References 

F.C. Nassaji Mazandaran seasons
Nassaji Mazandaran